Kevin James Wilson (born 18 April 1961) is an England-born Northern Irish former professional footballer who played as a striker. His last job was at Nuneaton Town, where he worked as manager.

Biography
Born in Banbury, Wilson started his career at Southern League club Banbury United, before signing for Derby County in 1979 for £20,000, which remains the record transfer fee received by Banbury. After Derby he played for Ipswich, Chelsea, Notts County, Bradford City, Walsall, and Northampton Town. At international level, Wilson played for Northern Ireland 42 times, scoring six goals. He is a former manager of Northampton Town, Bedford Town, Kettering Town and Hucknall Town. He was the manager of Corby Town until January 2008.

On 1 June 2009 he was appointed manager of Conference North side Ilkeston Town.

In May 2015 Wilson left Ilkeston to become manager of Nuneaton Town, following their relegation from the Conference Premier. In 2014–15 he had led Ilkeston to the Northern Premier League play-off final, where they lost to Curzon Ashton.

Honours
Walsall
Football League Third Division runner-up: 1994–95

References

External links

1961 births
Living people
Association footballers from Northern Ireland
Northern Ireland international footballers
English footballers
Sportspeople from Banbury
Banbury United F.C. players
Derby County F.C. players
Ipswich Town F.C. players
Chelsea F.C. players
Notts County F.C. players
Bradford City A.F.C. players
Walsall F.C. players
Northampton Town F.C. players
Northampton Town F.C. managers
Bedford Town F.C. managers
Aylesbury United F.C. managers
Kettering Town F.C. managers
Hucknall Town F.C. managers
Corby Town F.C. managers
Ilkeston Town F.C. managers
Ilkeston F.C. managers
Nuneaton Borough F.C. managers
Association football forwards
English football managers